Fazal Muhammad Khan is a Pakistani politician who had been a member of the National Assembly of Pakistan from August 2018 till July 2022.

Political career
He was elected to the National Assembly of Pakistan as a candidate of Pakistan Tehreek-e-Insaf (PTI) from Constituency NA-24 (Charsadda-II) in 2018 Pakistani general election. He received 83,495 votes and defeated Asfandyar Wali Khan.

Resignation

On April 10, 2022, because of the regime change of Imran Khan's government, he resigned from the National Assembly on the orders of Imran Khan. The new government did not accept the resignations of many members for fear of deteriorating the number of members. However, accepting the resignations of eleven members on July 28, 2022, one of them was Fakhar Zaman. Later, by-elections were held again on his seat, Imran Khan made a surprising move to stand on his own in all the by-seats.

References

External links

More reading
 List of members of the 15th National Assembly of Pakistan

Living people
Pakistani MNAs 2018–2023
Year of birth missing (living people)